Joseph Wu Jaushieh (born October 31, 1954) is a Taiwanese politician currently serving as the Minister of Foreign Affairs of the Republic of China under current President Tsai Ing-wen since February 26, 2018. He was formerly the Secretary-General to the President of the Republic of China and the Secretary-General of the National Security Council of the Republic of China . From 2007 to 2008, he was Chief Representative of Republic of China to the United States as the head of the Taipei Economic and Cultural Representative Office in Washington, D.C., having been appointed to that position by President Chen Shui-bian to succeed his predecessor, David Lee. On February 26, 2018, he took over the position of the Minister of Foreign Affairs, again succeeding David Lee.

Educational background
Prior to entering politics, he was an academic political scientist, finishing his PhD in political science in 1989 at Ohio State University.  He wrote his doctoral thesis on progress and obstacles to democratization in Taiwan.   He served as a teacher and research assistant in the political science department of Ohio State University in the United States, and as deputy director of the Institute of International Relations of National Chengchi University in Taiwan.

Rise in politics
Formerly the Deputy Secretary General of the Presidential Office for President Chen Shui-bian, Wu was appointed the chairman of the Mainland Affairs Council, the body charged with coordinating relations with Mainland China (the People's Republic of China), by Chen in May 2004.

His appointment as Chairman of the Mainland Affairs Council proved somewhat controversial due to his reputation as a supporter of Taiwan independence, especially in light of the simultaneous appointment as foreign minister of former independence activist Mark Chen. His tenure as head of TECRO lasted one year and three months.

Cross-strait relations

On April 11, 2013, the ROC Cabinet approved a bill to establish a Straits Exchange Foundation (SEF) branch office in Mainland China and an Association for Relations Across the Taiwan Straits (ARATS) office in Taiwan. Wu - who was once the ROC Minister of Mainland Affairs Council - said that for the ARATS office to be established in Taiwan, it would need to have three prerequisites: the office should never evolve to become like the PRC Liaison Office in Hong Kong; the office's mandate must be clearly defined; and the officers must adhere to international diplomatic regulations.

In May 2021, he became the first person listed on the “diehard supporters of Taiwan independence” blacklist proposed by the Chinese government.

References

1954 births
Living people
Ohio State University Graduate School alumni
Taiwan independence activists
Democratic Progressive Party (Taiwan) politicians
Politicians of the Republic of China on Taiwan from Changhua County
Representatives of Taiwan to the United States
Taiwanese political scientists
Taiwanese Ministers of Foreign Affairs